Kagojer Nouka is a Bengali language socio-political drama film directed by Parthasarathi Joarder and produced by Olivia Creation. This film was released on 13 May 2013. Nandan (Kolkata) theatre refused to screen this film. The film revolved around a chit fund scam. Director Joardar told the media that they sent the film to Nandan authority for preview, but he thought they did not even see the film before refusing it.

Plot
An officer of National Investigation Agency, Arvind Singh, investigates the chit funds scams of West Bengal. People are being misguided by these fraudulent schemes. This huge amount of money from the common people is used to finance films. Mr. Raman is a freedom fighter who goes all out to get rid of this menace to society. His son, Bhuvan, and his wife also get murdered. Finally, Mr. Sujoy Sen Sharma, another freedom fighter is the real kingpin who is running this chit fund business for helping the terrorist by supplying them arms to create terrorism in the state.

Cast
 Victor Banerjee as Raman
 Soumitra Chatterjee as Mr. Sujoy Sen Sharma
 Bidita Bag
Rajesh Sharma as Arvind Singh
Anusuya Majumdar
Priyam
Piyali Munshi

Songs 
 "Khujechhi Toke Shudhu" - Nilanjana Sarkar
 "Andhokare Poth Je Haray"
 "Ei Nesha" - Priyo Chatterjee - Kalpana Patowari
 "Andhokare Poth j Harai" - Sanchayita - Javed Ali
 "Rupia Chara Ki Rupashi Potere" - Priyo Chatterjee - Kalpona Patwari

References 

2013 films
Indian drama films
Bengali-language Indian films
2010s Bengali-language films
2013 drama films